State Route 114 (SR 114) is a  state highway located entirely within Chattooga County in the northwestern part of the U.S. state of Georgia.

Route description
The route begins at the Alabama state line as a continuation of Alabama State Route 68. The highway runs parallel to the Chattooga River, going through the towns of Chattoogaville and Lyerly before reaching Summerville. In Summerville, SR 100 has a short concurrency with SR 114 until they both reach their northern terminus at an intersection with US 27/SR 1.

SR 114 is not part of the National Highway System, a system of roadways important to the nation's economy, defense, and mobility.

Major intersections

See also

References

External links

 Georgia Roads (Routes 101-120)

114
Transportation in Chattooga County, Georgia